Club Deportivo Español de Talca, commonly known as Español de Talca, is a Chilean basketball club based in Talca. Founded in 1978, the team plays in the LNB Chile.

In 2018, the team played in the FIBA Americas League, where the club had a 0–3 record in the group phase.

Trophies
 Liga Nacional: 3
2010, 2012-13, 2016-17
 Dimayor: 1
1981
 Dimayor Apertura: 1
2001

Notable players 
  Stanley Robinson
  Tyran Walker

References

External links
Official website

Basketball teams in Chile
Basketball teams established in 1978
Sport in Maule Region